Paddie O'Neil (born Adalena Lillian Nail, 1 May 1926 – 31 January 2010) was a British actress and singer.

The daughter of circus and fairground performers, O'Neil spent her childhood travelling and performing at fairgrounds. While at stage school in London she was spotted and signed up by the BBC. She was a singer on the radio during the war years, and presented the variety show Navy Mixture. Paddie met the actor Alfred Marks while performing in Brighton, and they were married in 1952. They had two children. Also a writer of comedy material, Paddie was the first female writer-producer to be hired by Independent Television at its inception in 1954.

Filmography
 Penny Points to Paradise (1951)
 The Early Bird (1965)
 The Adding Machine (1969)
 Fanny Hill (1983)

References

External links

Obituary in The Telegraph
Obituary in The Stage
Obituary in The Independent

1926 births
2010 deaths
English film actresses
English women singers
Officers of the Order of the British Empire
People from Leominster